Vikram Samvat (IAST: Vikrama Samvat; abbreviated VS) or Bikram Sambat B.S. and also known as the Vikrami calendar, is a Hindu calendar historically used in the Indian subcontinent. Vikram Samvat is generally 57 years ahead of Gregorian Calendar, except during January to April, when it is ahead by 56 years. Alongside Nepal Sambat, it is one of the two official calendars used in Nepal. In India, it is used in several states. The traditional Vikram Samvat calendar, as used in India, uses lunar months and solar sidereal years. The Nepali Bikram Sambel, introduced in 1901, also uses a solar sidereal year.

History 

A number of ancient and medieval inscriptions used the Vikram Samvat. Although it was reportedly named after the legendary king Vikramaditya, the term "Vikrama Samvat" does not appear in the historical record before the 9th century; the same calendar system is found with other names, such as Krita and Malava. In colonial scholarship, the era was believed to be based on the commemoration of King Vikramaditya expelling the Sakas from Ujjain. However, later epigraphical evidence and scholarship suggest that this theory has no historical basis. During the 9th century, epigraphical artwork began using Vikram Samvat (suggesting that the Hindu calendar era in use became popular as Vikram Samvat); Buddhist and Jain epigraphy continued to use an era based on the Buddha or the Mahavira.

Vikramaditya legend 

According to popular tradition, King Vikramaditya of Ujjain established the Vikrama Samvat era after defeating the Śakas.

Kalakacharya Kathanaka (An account of the monk Kalakacharya), by the Jain sage Mahesarasuri, gives the following account: Gandharvasena, the then-powerful king of Ujjain, abducted a nun called Sarasvati, who was the sister of the monk. The enraged monk sought the help of the Śaka ruler King Sahi in Sistan. Despite heavy odds but aided by miracles, the Śaka king defeated Gandharvasena and made him a captive. Sarasvati was repatriated, although Gandharvasena himself was forgiven. The defeated king retired to the forest, where he was killed by a tiger. His son, Vikramaditya, being brought up in the forest, had to rule from Pratishthana (modern Paithan in Maharashtra). Later on, Vikramaditya invaded Ujjain and drove away from the Śakas. To commemorate this event, he started a new era called the "Vikrama era". The Ujjain calendar started around 58–56 BCE, and the subsequent Shaka-era calendar was started in 78 CE at Pratishthana.

Historical origins 
The association of the era beginning in 57 BCE with Vikramaditya is not found in any source before the 9th century CE; earlier sources call the era "Kṛṭa" (343 and 371 CE), "Kritaa" (404), "the era of the Malava tribe" (424), or simply "Samvat". The earliest known inscription which calls the era "Vikrama" is from 842. This inscription, from the Chauhana ruler Chandamahasena, was found at Dholpur and is dated "Vikrama Samvat 898, Vaishakha Shukla 2, Chanda" (20 April 842). The earliest known inscription which associates the era with a king called Vikramaditya is dated 971, and the earliest literary work connecting the era to Vikramaditya is Subhashita-Ratna-Sandoha (993-994) by the Jain author Amitagati.

A number of authors believe that the Vikram Samvat was not started by Vikramaditya, who might be a legendary king or a title adopted by a later king who renamed the era after himself. V. A. Smith and D. R. Bhandarkar believed that Chandragupta II adopted the title of Vikramaditya, and changed the era's name to "Vikrama Samvat". According to Rudolf Hoernlé, the king responsible for this change was Yashodharman. Hoernlé believed that he conquered Kashmir and is the "Harsha Vikramaditya" mentioned in Kalhana's Rajatarangini.

Some earlier scholars believed that the Vikram Samvat corresponded to the Azes era of the Indo-Scythian (Śaka) king King Azes. This was disputed by Robert Bracey after the discovery of an inscription of Vijayamitra, which is dated in two eras. The theory was discredited by Falk and Bennett, who place the inception of the Azes era in 47–46 BCE.

Popularity 

The Vikram Samvat has been used by Hindus, Sikhs, and Pashtuns. One of several regional Hindu calendars in use on the Indian subcontinent, it is based on twelve synodic lunar months and 365 solar days. The lunar year begins with the new moon of the month of Chaitra. This day, known as Chaitra Sukhladi, is a restricted (optional) holiday in India.

The calendar remains in use by people in Nepal serving as its national calendar and is also symbolically used by Hindus of north, west and central India. In south India and portions of east and west India (such as Assam, West Bengal and Gujarat), the Indian national calendar is widely used.

With the arrival of Islamic rule, the Hijri calendar became the official calendar of sultanates and the Mughal Empire. During British colonial rule of the Indian subcontinent, the Gregorian calendar was adopted and is commonly used in urban areas of India. The predominantly-Muslim countries of Pakistan and Bangladesh have used the Islamic calendar since 1947, but older texts included the Vikram Samvat and Gregorian calendars. In 2003, the India-based Sikh Shiromani Gurdwara Parbandhak Committee controversially adopted the Nanakshahi calendar. Alongside Nepal Sambat, Vikram Samvat is one of two official calendars used in Nepal.

Calendar system
Like the Hebrew and Chinese calendars, the Vikram Samvat is lunisolar. In common years, the year is 354 days long, while a leap month (adhik maas) is added in accordance to the Metonic cycle roughly once every three years (or 7 times in a 19-year cycle) to ensure that festivals and crop-related rituals fall in the appropriate season. Early Buddhist communities in India adopted the ancient Hindu calendar, followed by the Vikram Samvat and local Buddhist calendars. Buddhist festivals are still scheduled according to a lunar system.

The Vikram Samvat has two systems. It began in 56 BCE in the southern Hindu calendar system (amaanta) and 57–56 BCE in the northern system (purnimaanta). The Shukla Paksha, when most festivals occur, coincides in both systems. The lunisolar Vikram Samvat calendar is 56.7 years ahead of the solar Gregorian calendar; the year  BS begins mid-April  CE, and ends mid-April  CE.

The Rana dynasty of Nepal made the Bikram Sambat the official Hindu calendar in 1901 CE, which began as 1958 BS. The new year in Nepal begins with the first day of the month of Baisakh, which usually falls around 13–15 April in the Gregorian calendar and ends with the last day of the month Chitra. The first day of the new year is a public holiday in Nepal. Bisket Jatra, an annual carnival in Bhaktapur, is also celebrated on Baishakh 1. In 2007, Nepal Sambat was also recognised as a national calendar alongside Bikram Sambat.

In India, the reformulated Saka calendar is officially used (except for computing dates of the traditional festivals). In the Hindi version of the preamble of the constitution of India, the date of its adoption (26 November 1949) is presented in Vikram Samvat as Margsheersh Shukla Saptami Samvat 2006. A call has been made for the Vikram Samvat to replace the Saka calendar as India's official calendar.

New Year
Chaitra Navaratri: the second most celebrated, named after vasanta which means spring. It is observed the lunar month of Chaitra (post-winter, March–April). In many regions the festival falls after spring harvest, and in others during harvest. It also marks the first day of the Hindu calendar, hence also known as the Hindu Lunar New Year according to Vikram Samvat calendar.
Vaisakhi:
Vaisakhi marks the beginning of Hindu Solar New Year in Punjab, Northern, Eastern, North-eastern and Central India according to the solar Vikram Samvat calendar. and marks the first day of the month of Vaisakha, which is usually celebrated on 13 or 14 April every year and is a historical and religious festival in Hinduism.
Baisakhi (Nepal): Baisakhi is celebrated as Nepalese New Year because it is the day which marks Hindu Solar New Year as per the solar Nepali Bikram Sambat.

Divisions of a year

The Vikram Samvat uses lunar months and solar sidereal years. Because 12 months do not match a sidereal year, correctional months (adhika māsa) are added or (occasionally) subtracted (kshaya masa). A lunar year consists of 12 months, and each month has two fortnights, with a variable duration ranging from 29 to 32 days. The lunar days are called tithis. Each month has 30 tithis, which vary in length from 20 to 27 hours. The waxing phase, beginning with the day after the new moon (amavasya), is called gaura or shukla paksha (the bright or auspicious fortnight). The waning phase is called krishna or vadhya paksha (the dark fortnight, considered inauspicious).

Lunar metrics

 A tithi is the time it takes for the longitudinal angle between the Moon and the Sun to increase by 12°. Tithis begin at various times of the day, and vary in duration.
 A paksha (or pakṣa) is a lunar fortnight and consists of 15 tithis.
 A māsa, or lunar month (about 29.5 days), is divided into two paksas.
 A ritu (season) is two māsas.
 An ayana is three ritus.
 A year is two ayanas.

Months 
The classical Vikram Samvat is generally 57 years ahead of Gregorian Calendar, except during January to April, when it is ahead by 56 years. The month that the new year starts varies by region or sub-culture.

The Nepali BS, like other tropical calendars (such as Bangla) starts with Baisakh.

As of 14 April 2022, it is 2079 BS in the BS calendar. The names of months in the Vikram Samvat in Sanskrit and Nepali, with their roughly corresponding Gregorian months, respectively are:

See also
 Hindu units of time
 Hindu calendar
 Vira Nirvana Samvat
Muhurtam

References

Further reading

 Harry Falk and Chris Bennett (2009). "Macedonian Intercalary Months and the Era of Azes." Acta Orientalia 70, pp. 197–215.
 "The Dynastic Art of the Kushan", John Rosenfield.

External links
 Kyoto University Gregorian – Saka – Vikrami Calendar Converter Tool, M. YANO and M. FUSHIMI
 Converter for Nepali date to Gregorian date
 Convert Vikram_Samvat to Gregorian date and Gregorian date to Vikram_Samvat
 Today Hindu Tithi  Vikram_Samvat Hindu Date

Punjabi culture
Time in India
Specific calendars

Memorials to Vikramaditya
Lunisolar calendars
Calendar eras

Time in Nepal
Nepali calendar